Dmytro Ruslanovych Oliynyk (born 25 February 1993) is a Ukrainian professional footballer who plays as a right midfielder for Ukrainian club Obolon Kyiv.

References

External links
 Profile on Obolon Kyiv official website
 

1993 births
Living people
Ukrainian footballers
Association football midfielders
FC Shakhtar-3 Donetsk players
FC Olimpik Donetsk players
FC Poltava players
PFC Sumy players
NK Veres Rivne players
FC Metalurh Zaporizhzhia players
FC Obolon-Brovar Kyiv players
Ukrainian First League players
Ukrainian Second League players
Sportspeople from Donetsk Oblast